Sigríður Björk Þorláksdóttir Baxter (born May 27, 1977) is an Icelandic retired Alpine skier and football player.

Alpine skiing
Sigríður competed at the 1998 Winter Olympics in the women's slalom and was the Icelandic national champion in slalom and Giant slalom in 1998.

Football
Sigríður played football in the Icelandic top-tier Úrvalsdeild kvenna for Stjarnan and Breiðablik, where she won the Icelandic Football Cup and Icelandic Football Super Cup in 1998.

She was a player-manager for Fram in 2010 and took over as manager of Höttur women's team in November 2010 where she served until 2014.

References

1977 births
Alpine skiers at the 1998 Winter Olympics
Sigridur Thorlaksdottir Baxter
Female association football managers
Sigridur Thorlaksdottir Baxter
Sigridur Thorlaksdottir Baxter
Sigridur Thorlaksdottir Baxter
Living people
Sigridur Thorlaksdottir Baxter
Sigridur Thorlaksdottir Baxter
Sigridur Thorlaksdottir Baxter
Sigridur Thorlaksdottir Baxter
Women's association footballers not categorized by position
Íþróttafélagið Höttur players